Le Soir is a French language weekly news magazine published in Brussels, Belgium. Founded 1928 it is one of the oldest magazines in the country.

History and profile
Le Soir was established in 1928. The magazine is owned and published by Rossel et Cie SA on a weekly basis, and its headquarters is in Brussels. As of 2015 Marc Pasteger was the editor-in-chief of the magazine.

The weekly provides the political, economic, social and cultural news. The magazine also features articles about celebrity news and offers a TV guide.

Between February 2007 and June 2007 Le Soir sold 56,492 copies. The circulation of the weekly was 54.047 copies in 2010 and 56.611 copies in 2011. The magazine sold 56.044 copies in 2012. In 2013 the magazine had a circulation of 55,888 copies.

See also
 List of magazines in Belgium

References

External links
 Official website

1928 establishments in Belgium
Celebrity magazines
French-language magazines
Magazines established in 1928
Magazines published in Brussels
News magazines published in Belgium
Television magazines
Weekly magazines published in Belgium